The 1948 Swiss Grand Prix was a Grand Prix motor race held at Circuit Bremgarten, near Bern, on 4 July 1948. Despite racing for nearly two hours, at the finishing line Frenchman Jean-Pierre Wimille was only 0.2 seconds behind the race winner, the Italian driver Carlo Felice Trossi. Trossi's compatriot Luigi Villoresi finished over two and a half minutes behind the pair, in third place. Pre-World War II star driver Achille Varzi was killed when he crashed during practice, and the wealthy Swiss privateer Christian Kautz died in an accident during the race.

Classification

References

Swiss Grand Prix
Swiss Grand Prix
Grand Prix